Anthony William Gardiner (January 24, 1820 – 1885) served as the ninth president of Liberia from 1878 until 1883. He was the first of a series of True Whig presidents who held power uninterruptedly until 1980.

Early years
Gardiner was born in Southampton County, Virginia in the United States. In 1831, in the wake of Nat Turner's Slave Rebellion in Southampton, when Gardiner was still a child, his was one of the families who relocated to Liberia under the sponsorship of the American Colonization Society. Gardiner received his law degree in Liberia and, in 1847, he served as a delegate to the National Convention, which drafted Liberia's declaration of independence and constitution. He became Liberia's first attorney general and later served in the House of Representatives of Liberia from 1855 to 1871. He served as Speaker of the House of Representatives 1860–1861.

In May 1871, he was elected vice-president and was elected once again, serving until 1876. During the incapacitation of President Joseph Jenkins Roberts from 1875 until early 1876, Gardiner was also acting president.

Less than two years after leaving office as acting president, Gardiner won election to the presidency, taking office in 1878. In the same election, the True Whig Party won a massive victory and proceeded to dominate Liberian politics until a coup d'état in 1980 ended almost a century and a half of minority rule by the Americo-Liberians.

Presidency (1878–1883)

The decades after 1868, escalating economic difficulties weakened the state's dominance over the coastal indigenous population. Conditions worsened, the cost of imports was far greater than the income generated by exports of coffee, rice, palm oil, sugarcane, and timber. Liberia tried desperately to modernize its largely agricultural economy.
As president, Gardiner called for increased trade with and investment from outside countries, improved public education, and closer relations with Liberia's native peoples. However, his policies were overshadowed by the ramifications of the European powers "scramble for Africa".

Territorial conflicts with European powers

Rivalries between the Europeans colonizing West Africa and the interest of the United States helped preserve Liberian independence during this period, and until 1919, in spite of Liberia's ongoing disputes with England and France.

During Gardiner's administration difficulties with the British Empire and Imperial Germany reached a crisis. Liberia was drawn into a border conflict with the British Empire over the Gallinas territory, lying between the Sewa River and the Mano River—territory which now forms the extreme eastern part of Sierra Leone. The British made a formal show of force at Monrovia in a mission led by Sir Arthur Havelock; meanwhile, the looting of a German vessel along the Kru Coast and personal indignities inflicted by the natives upon the shipwrecked Germans, led to the bombardment of Nana Kru by the German corvette  and the presentation at Monrovia of a claim for damages, payment of which was forced by the threat of the bombardment of the capital.

Resignation
President Gardiner resigned on January 20, 1883, due to a serious illness. He was succeeded by the vice-president, Alfred F. Russell. Two months later, in March 1883, the British Government would annex the Gallinas territory west of the Mano River and formally incorporate it into Sierra Leone.

See also
History of Liberia

References

This article incorporates public domain text from Brawley, A Social History of The American Negro, retrieved from Project Gutenberg

Further reading
see History of Liberia, further reading

External links
Liberia Past and Present: Anthony W. Gardiner
The True Whig Ascendancy
see also History of Liberia, external links

1820 births
1885 deaths
American emigrants to Liberia
Attorneys general of Liberia
Liberian lawyers
People from Grand Bassa County
People from Southampton County, Virginia
Presidents of Liberia
Signatories of the Liberian Declaration of Independence
Speakers of the House of Representatives of Liberia
True Whig Party politicians
Vice presidents of Liberia
19th-century Liberian lawyers
19th-century Liberian politicians
20th-century Liberian lawyers
Date of death missing
19th-century African-American people